The Kerala State Film Award for Best Director is an honour presented annually at the Kerala State Film Awards of India since 1969. It is given to a film director who has exhibited outstanding direction while working in the Malayalam film industry. Until 1997, the awards were managed directly by the Department of Cultural Affairs of the Government of Kerala. Since 1998, the Kerala State Chalachitra Academy, an autonomous non-profit organisation functioning under the Department of Cultural Affairs, has been exercising control over the awards. The recipients are decided by an independent jury formed by the academy. They are declared by the Minister for Cultural Affairs and are presented by the Chief Minister.

The first Kerala State Film Awards ceremony was held in 1970 with cinematographer-director A. Vincent receiving the Best Director award for his work in Nadhi (1969). Throughout the years, accounting for ties and repeat winners, the Government of Kerala has presented a total of 50 best director awards to 25 different filmmakers.

G. Aravindan is the most frequent winner in this category with seven awards. He is followed by Adoor Gopalakrishnan (six awards), Shyamaprasad (five awards) and K. S. Sethumadhavan (four awards). As of 2020, six directorsShaji N. Karun, M. T. Vasudevan Nair, T. V. Chandran, Hariharan, Blessy and Lijo Jose Pellissery have won the award twice in their careers. The academy did not present the award at the 2002 ceremony. Vidhu Vincent was the first female director to win the award in 2016, for her debut film Manhole. The most recent recipient was Sidhartha Siva, who received the award for his film Ennivar in 2020.

Winners

Notes

References

External links 
Official website
PRD, Govt. of Kerala: Awardees List

Kerala State Film Awards